A sunshower or sun shower is a meteorological phenomenon in which rain falls while the sun is shining. A sunshower is usually the result of accompanying winds associated with a rain storm sometimes miles away, blowing the airborne raindrops into an area where there are no clouds, therefore causing a sunshower. Sometimes a sunshower is created when a single rain shower cloud passes overhead, and the Sun's angle keeps the sunlight from being obstructed by overhead clouds.

Sunshower conditions often lead to the appearance of a rainbow, if the sun is at a sufficiently low angle. Although used in the United States, Canada, Australia, New Zealand, Ireland and the UK, the term "sunshower" is rarely found in dictionaries. Additionally, the phenomenon has a wide range of sometimes remarkably similar folkloric names in cultures around the world. A common theme is that of clever animals and tricksters getting married or related to the devil, although many variations of this theme are in existence.

Folkloric names

In Afrikaans and in Hindi, this phenomenon, i.e. when it rains and the sun shines, the traditional belief is Jakkals trou met wolf se vrou, meaning 'Jackal marries wolf's wife'.
In Albania, when it rains and the sun shines, people say that a Romani wedding is taking place. .
In Argentina and Uruguay, it is said that an old woman is getting married: "Llueve con sol, se casa una vieja". It is also used El mono del Casamiento de Mirtha Legrand, meaning 'The monkey at the wedding of Mirtha Legrand'.
In Nigeria, when it rains and the sun is shining at the same time, people say that a Lion is giving/has given birth. 
In Morocco, Algeria and Tunisia, it is called " (Ar's A'Dib)" or "the wolf's wedding" in Arabic and "" (the jackal's wedding) in Tamaziɣt.
In Bangladesh and West Bengal, India: "" "Khêkshialer biye" "Jackal's(or fox's) wedding"
In Basque: "Azeri besta" ("Fox feast") or "Azeri ezteia" ("Fox's wedding"): as the sun is shining, the chickens stay outside, but as it is also raining, they remain still, paralyzed by the rain; the fox seizes that occasion to eat them.
In Belgium, Flanders: the traditional belief is that of "Duiveltjeskermis" or "Devil's fair"
In Brazil, "" (fox's wedding), "", which is a rhyme that means "Sun and rain, widow's wedding/marriage" or "", which is a rhyme that means "Rain and Sun, Spanish man's wedding/marriage" (which is often used as a response to the first rhyme or vice versa).
In Bulgaria, there is a saying about a bear getting married. In different parts of the country people say "Дяволът се жени.", referring to this phenomenon, which translates to "The Devil is getting married."
In Catalonia it is said that the witches are combing their hair: "".
In Croatia, it is said that gypsies are marrying, "".
In Cuba, "", i.e. "The Devil's daughter is getting married"
In Efik culture of south eastern flank of Nigeria, it is believed that the lioness (or any of the wild cats) is giving birth behind the house.
In El Salvador, it is said that the deer is giving birth.
In Estonian, the phenomenon is described as "orphans' tears", where the sun is the grandmother drying those tears.
In Ethiopia and Eritrea, it is said that the hyena is giving birth.
In Finland, it is called "" or "foxes are taking bath"
In France, it is either ""  "the devil beats his wife and marries his daughter", or "" "the devil beats his wife to have crêpes" and both were inspired from Plutarch's poem in Eusebius' Praeparatio Evangelica where Zeus, angry with Hera, made her believe that he was marrying Daedale when in fact it was a wooden statue. Hera, jealous, provoked a heavy downpour on the wedding day but at the same time realised the trick. In order to redeem herself, she turned her cries into laughter, reconciled herself with Zeus and happily took the lead of the wedding party, instituting the festival of Daedala in memory of the event.
In Galician, the traditional belief is that the vixen or the fox are getting married: casa a raposa / casa o raposo; sometimes the wolf and the vixen: Estanse casando o lobo coa raposa.
 A wide range of expressions are attested in the German-speaking countries, many of them historically, e.g. "There's a feast day in hell" (Oldenburg), "marriage [in hell]" (East Frisia), "funfair [in hell]" (Westphalia, Rhineland), the latter one attested already in 1630. Others are "They're baking in hell", "The devil is making pancakes" (Oldenburg), "Frau Holle hosts a funfair" (Lower Rhineland), "There's a marriage among the heathens/gypsies" (Switzerland), "The devil's dancing with his grandmother" (Winsen district, Lower Saxony), "The devil is marrying" (Schleswig-Holstein), "The devil is endowing his daughters" (Mecklenburg). Often, the phenomenon is interpreted as a struggle between rain and sunshine. "The devil is beating his wife/grandmother/mother-in-law" (Bavaria, Austria, Lunenburg), "The deviless gets beaten" (Eger country, Bohemia), "The devil is stabbing his wife with a sword" (Celle, Lower Saxony), "The devil has hanged his mother" (Moselle). The versions referring to the devil's wife (instead of grandmother etc) are the older ones. Praetorius (Blockes Berges Verrichtung, Leipzig 1668) mentions „Der Teufel schlägt seine Mutter, daß sie öl gibt“ (The devil is beating his mother so she will give oil). In Schleswig-Holstein and Oldenburg, there's also: "The devil is bleaching his grandmother", as this usually involved repeated dampening of cloth in the sun – quite fitting for the weather phenomenon. Otherwise, idioms refer to witches. "The witches are dancing", "The old witch is making pancakes" (Schleswig-Holstein), "The witches are making butter" (Silesia), "The witches are being buried at the end of the world" (North Frisia). Although later on witches are often depicted as the devil's mistresses, not a single idiom about sunshowers shows them as such. Around the Baltic Sea, there are also references to sunshowers and "whore's children", i.e. illegitimate children: "Now a whore's child has been sired/baptised" (Mecklenburg). Similar expressions could be found in Finland. Furthermore there are humorous versions like: "A lieutenant is paying his debts" (Rhineland), "A nobleman goes to heaven" (Lunenburg), "A tailor goes to heaven" (Schleswig-Holstein, Upper Saxony), "The devil gets a lawyer's soul" (Oldenburg). Completely different in origin are "The wolf has fever/bellyache" or "Now the wolves are pissing" (Mecklenburg).

In Greece they say "," which means "Sun and rain, the poor are marrying. Sun and moon, the donkeys are marrying."
In Guyana, it is known as "Sun-Rain".
In Haiti, it is said that a zombie is beating his wife for salty food. Devil is sometimes interchanged for zombie.
In Hawaii, it is known as "ghost rain" or "liquid sunshine".
In Hebrew it is called a  – a lying sun
In Hungary, it is known as "veri az ördög a feleségét" which translates to "the devil is beating his wife".
In Indonesian, the phenomenon is the sign of someone who is rich and well known has died in the place where the sunshower happened, so the sky is showing its condolences.
In Iran it is known as "" which means "wolf giving birth".
In Italy they say ", la gatta fa l'amore" which means "It rains with the sun, the (female) cat is making love".
In Jamaica, "the devil and his wife are fighting for a piece of hambone."
In Japan, it is known as "Kitsune no yomeiri" (狐の嫁入り), or "the fox's wedding."
In Kazakhstan, it is said that a poor man got rich, "".
In Kenya, hyenas or monkeys are marrying.
In Korea, one common term is "fox rain" (여우비), referring to a legend about a tiger marrying a fox, causing a cloud, who loved the fox, to weep behind the sun. For this reason, the day of a sunshower is also called 호랑이 장가가는 날 "tiger's wedding day".
In Lebanon, the saying is "the rats are having a wedding".
In the Mazandarani language, in north of Iran, it is also called "the jackal's wedding".
In Macedonia, it is also said that gypsies are marrying, "", and also that a bear is getting married: "".
In Maldives, it is also "The rain that falls when a noble infidel dies".
In Malta it is known as "Twieled Tork" which translates to "A Turkish baby has been born".
In Tunisia and Morocco, it is the "wolf's wedding". In the north, they say: "Shta Wel Kayla Wel 'Urss Del 'Ayla" which means "The rain and the sun and the girl's wedding."
In Nepal (Nepali), it is called "a jackal's wedding" or "" which literally translates to "Sunshower, sunshower, a jackal's wedding". There are folksongs about sunshowers.
In Pashto, it is also called "" or "the jackal's wedding". 
In Punjab, it is also called "Kani gidri da viah"(one eye jackal's wedding) or "giddar gidri da viah"(wolf's wedding).
In Paraguay, it is said that "El Diablo se está casando" or "The Devil's getting married".
In Philippines, it is said the tikbalang is marrying.
In Poland it is said that a witch is making butter, "".
In Puerto Rico and the Dominican Republic, it is said that a witch is getting married.
In Russian and Lithuanian, it is called , "mushroom rain", as such conditions are traditionally believed to be favorable to growing mushrooms. Also, it is called , "blind rain", because it doesn't see that it shouldn't be raining.
In Rwanda they say "impyisi yarongoye" which means fox get married
In Serbia, It is said traditionally believed that angels are bathing, "" (Anđeli se kupaju).
In Sri Lanka in the Sinhala, it is called "the fox's wedding".
In South African English, a sunshower is referred to as a "monkey's wedding", a loan translation of the Zulu , a wedding for monkeys. 
In Sudan, the donkey and monkey are getting married.
 In various African languages, leopards are getting married.
In Sweden it is called "vitterväder".
In Trinidad and Tobago, it is called "Monkey Marriddin" or monkeys marrying.
In Tanzania, they say "Simba anazaa" – literally "the lioness is giving birth".
In Thailand, it is said to happen when somebody passes away.
In Trinidad and Tobago, "Sun shining, Rain falling, Monkey marrying"
In Turkey, it is called "çakal yağmuru" which means jackal rain.
In Ukraine, it is called "грибний дощ (hrybnyj doshch)" or "the mushroom rain".
In parts of the United Kingdom, traditional belief is that it is "a monkey's birthday".
In the Southern United States, a sunshower is traditionally believed to be when "the devil is beating his wife." A regional belief from Tennessee is "the devil is kissing his wife".
In Venezuela, the word 'cachimba' refers to raining while sunny.
In Vietnamese, it is called "mua bong may" or "" (cloud shadow rain)
In Zimbabwe, it is referred to as a "monkey's wedding".

India
In Assamese, it is called "Khonra xiyaalor biya", meaning "the bob-tailed fox's wedding".
In Bengali, it is called "the blind fox's wedding".
In Bihar's languages it is called a "siyaar ke biyaah" ("jackals' wedding") with children singing about it.
In Gujarati, it is called "Naago varsaad", meaning "naked rain".
In Kannada, it is called "Kaage Nari maduve" which means "Crow and fox marrying"
In Konkani, it is called "a monkey's wedding". 
In Kumaoni, it is called स्याव कुकुरे ब्या ISO: syāva kukurē byā which means "Fox & Dog's wedding".
In Maharashtra region of India, in Marathi, it is called "Kolhyache Lagna",(कोल्ह्याचे लग्न) which means "marriage of a fox".
In Malayalam, it is called "the fox's wedding"
In Oriya, it is called "the fox's wedding".
In some Pahari Languages of Himachal Pradesh, they say Takri: 𑚌𑚮𑚛𑚖𑚯𑚣𑚭𑚫 𑚤𑚭 𑚠𑚶𑚣𑚭𑚩, ISO: gidaḍīyām̐ rā byāh, meaning "Female Foxes' Wedding".
In Rajasthani language(s), they say "Bhoot Bhootni Ra byaa" meaning "the wedding of 2 ghosts"
In Tamil, it is called "The fox and the crow are marrying".
In Telugu, it is called "Yenda Vanalo, kukkala nakkala pelli" which means "Dogs and foxes marrying in the sunshowers". It can also be called "Kaki Pelli", which means "crow's marriage".
In Garo, it is called "peru bia ka'enga", which means "fox's/jackal's marriage".
In India, and Burma, those who speak the Tangkhul language, refer to sunshowers as the 'wedding of a spirit to a human'.

See also
April shower

References

Bibliography
 Blust, Robert (1998) The Fox's Wedding. Manuscript, University of Hawaii.
 Evgen'jeva, A. P., ed. (1985-) Slovar' russkogo jazyka v 4 tomakh, 3rd edition. Moscow.
 Kuusi, Matti (1957) Regen bei Sonnenschein: Zur Weltgeschichte einer Redensart. "Folklore Fellows Communications" n. 171, Helsinki 1957 (it appeared translated into Italian in the journal "Quaderni di Semantica" 13 (1992) and 14 (1993)).
 Hoffmann-Krayer, E. (1930–31) Handwörterbuch des deutschen Aberglaubens. Berlin and Leipzig: Walter de Gruyter.

External links

Languagehat
Word-detective.com
Theidioms.com
The Wyandot Nation of Kansas - Myth on the origin of sunshowers

Precipitation
Weather lore

fr:Averse#Averse par temps ensoleillé